Matthew Palleschi (born January 11, 1983) is a Canadian former soccer player who played as a midfielder and forward

Career

College career 
Palleschi played at the college level with the Humber College Hawks, where he was named Team MVP and to CCAA All-Canadian Team in his rookie year in 2002. In his sophomore season with Humber, he received further accolades by being named a Central West Region League All-Star and received the Canadian Colleges Athletic Association All Canadian award. In 2003, he assisted Humber in securing a postseason berth, and reached the semifinals but was defeated by Algonquin College.

Early career 
He had a brief stint abroad in Italy with Frosinone Calcio in 2003. He made his debut on April 27, 2003, against Acireale. In 2003, he returned to Canada to play in the Canadian Professional Soccer League with Vaughan Sun Devils. In his debut season with Vaughan, he assisted in securing a postseason berth and scored the winning goal in the semifinal match against Hamilton Thunder. In the CPSL Championship final, Vaughan was defeated by the Brampton Hitmen.  

He would re-sign with Vaughan for the 2004 season. For the second consecutive season, he helped Vaughan reach the championship final but was defeated by Toronto Croatia. In his third season with Vaughan, he assisted in securing the Western Conference title which clinched a playoff berth for the club. In the opening round of the postseason, he recorded a hattrick against Toronto Croatia which advanced Vaughan to the championship final for the third consecutive season. He appeared in the championship final but this time Vaughan was defeated by Oakville Blue Devils.

Toronto and Montreal 
In the initial stages of the 2006 season, he was offered a trial with Montreal Impact but an injury prevented it from materializing. Shortly after he signed with the Toronto Lynx of the USL First Division. Throughout his tenure with Toronto, he assisted the club in reaching the Open Canada Cup final against Ottawa St. Anthony Italia.  

After the relegation of Toronto to the PDL, he signed with league rivals Montreal Impact. On April 21, 2007, he made his Impact debut coming on as a substitute for Mauro Biello, and as well scoring a goal. In total, Palleschi played 26 games for the Impact and scored 3 goals. In the initial stages of the season, he assisted Montreal in achieving an eight-game undefeated streak. He also contributed to Montreal's success in winning the 2007 Voyageurs Cup. The following season Montreal released him from his contract.

In 2008, he returned to his former team Vaughan Shooters later renamed Italia Shooters. He assisted the Shooters in clinching the International Division title.  In 2014, he played in the Ontario Soccer League with the Richmond Hill Madrid where he finished as the top goal scorer in the Central Premier division and was named MVP.

Personal life
Palleschi is friends with Tampa Bay Rowdies defender Andres Arango.

Honors

Vaughan/Italia Shooters 
 Canadian Professional Soccer League Eastern Conference: 2005
 Canadian Soccer League International Division: 2008

Montreal Impact 
Voyageurs Cup: 2007

References

1983 births
Living people
Canadian expatriate soccer players
Canadian expatriate sportspeople in Italy
Canadian Soccer League (1998–present) players
Canadian soccer players
Expatriate footballers in Italy
Association football forwards
Frosinone Calcio players
Canadian people of Italian descent
York Region Shooters players
Montreal Impact (1992–2011) players
Sportspeople from Richmond Hill, Ontario
Toronto Lynx players
USL First Division players